Kleinhans, formally The Kleinhans Company, was a high-end men's clothing store located in Buffalo, New York.  Edward Kleinhans and his brother Horace opened the store in 1893, and shortly after located in the Brisbane Building at Main and Clinton Streets on Lafayette Square in Downtown Buffalo. The store would eventually grow to be , and was said to be the largest men's clothing store in the country. Edward Kleinhans died in 1934, and left his estate to the city to build the Kleinhans Music Hall.  Hart Schaffner & Marx (later Hartmarx) purchased the company in 1967 and operated the chain until it closed December 30, 1992.

References
Rizzo, Michael F. (2007) Nine Nine Eight: The Glory Days of Buffalo Shopping Lulu Enterprises, Inc.; Morrisville, North Carolina. .

Defunct retail companies of the United States
Companies based in Buffalo, New York
Defunct companies based in New York (state)